Bailey Sugden is a British kickboxer. He is the current ISKA K-1 World 63.5 kg Champion.

Biography and career
Bailey Sugden started kickboxing training at the age of 4 under the teaching of his father Dean Sugden, a former WKA Kickboxing world champion.

Sugden had 22 wins, 5 losses and 1 draw as an amateur kickboxer. He turned professional on 21 March 2015, at the Future Stars League event in Harrow, England. He won a 4-man tournament, defeating Luke Portrainer by unanimous decision in the semi final and Joe Himsworth in the final by unanimous decision.

On 11 March 2017, Sugden took part in the 2017 Road to Glory UK Tournament. He defeated Andrew Liddell by third-round technical knockout. In the semi final he defeated Adrian Maxim by majority decision. In the final he lost to Mo Adburahaman by unanimous decision. Despite the loss he received a Glory contract.

On 14 July 2017, Sugden made his Glory promotional debut at Glory 43: New York against Arthur Sorsor. He won the fight by unanimous decision.

On 9 December 2017, Sugden was scheduled to face Zhang Chenglong at Glory 49: Rotterdam. He won the fight by unanimous decision.

On 31 March 2018, Sugden faced Zakaria Zouggary at Glory 52: Los Angeles. He lost the fight by unanimous decision.

On 28 September 2019, Sugden faced Asa Ten Pow at Glory 68: Miami. He lost the fight by unanimous decision.

On 22 January 2021, it was announced that Sugden would face Václav Sivák at Oktagon Underground: Last Man Standing on 27 February 2021, in the quarterfinals of the Oktagon 70 kg tournament. He lost the fight by majority decision.

On 18 March 2022, Sugden faced Ibrahim Madi from France for the vacant ISKA K-1 World 63.5 kg title in Grantham, England. He won the fight by unanimous decision after five rounds.

Sugden made his first ISKA K-1 title defense against Pedro Ruiz on 11 March 2023. He won the fight by unanimous decision.

Titles and achievements

Professional
International Sport Kickboxing Association
 2022 ISKA K-1 World 63.5 kg Champion
Glory
 2017 Road to Glory UK 65 kg Tournament runner-up

Amateur
International Sport Kickboxing Association
ISKA K1 English Champion
JFCC KIkcboxing
2x JFCC Five Nations Full Contact Champion
World Kickboxing Association
 WKA British Open Champion
 2009 WKA World Championships U-12 +45 kg Champion
 2009 WKA British Championships U-12 +45 kg Champion

Fight record

|-  style="text-align:center; background:#cfc;"
| 2023-03-11|| Win ||align=left| Pedro Ruiz || FIGHT MAX Superstar Fight League|| Grantham, England || Decision (Unanimous) ||  5 || 3:00   
|-
! style=background:white colspan=9 |

|-  style="text-align:center; background:#cfc;"
| 2022-03-18|| Win ||align=left| Ibrahim Madi || FIGHT MAX Superstar Fight League|| Grantham, England || Decision (unanimous) || 5 || 3:00  
|-
! style=background:white colspan=9 |

|- style="background:#cfc;"
| 2021-10-09|| Win ||align=left| Matthieu Guevara || Road to ONE: Muay Thai Grand Prix || London, United Kingdom || Decision (Unanimous)  || 3 || 3:00

|-  style="text-align:center; background:#fbb;"
| 2021-02-27|| Loss||align=left| Václav Sivák || Oktagon Underground – Last Man Standing, Quarter Final || Prague, Czech Republic || Decision (majority)|| 3 || 3:00

|-  style="background:#cfc;"
| 2019-11-23 || Win ||align=left| John Morehouse || Glory 72: Chicago || Chicago, USA || TKO (Referee stoppage) || 1 || 2:12

|-  style="background:#fbb;"
| 2019-09-28 || Loss ||align=left| Asa Ten Pow || Glory 68: Miami || Miami, USA || Decision (Unanimous) || 3 || 3:00

|-  style="background:#fbb;"
| 2019-05-17 || Loss ||align=left| Thong Fairtex || Glory 65: Utrecht || Utrecht, Netherlands || Decision (Split) || 3 || 3:00

|-  style="background:#cfc;"
| 2019-02-01 || Win ||align=left| Quade Taranaki || Glory 63: Houston || Houston, USA || Decision (Unanimous) || 3 || 3:00

|-  style="background:#fbb;"
| 2018-09-14 || Loss ||align=left| Anvar Boynazarov || Glory 58:Chicago || Chicago, USA || Decision (Split) || 3 || 3:00

|- style="background:#c5d2ea;"
| 2018-06-02|| NC||align=left| Aleksei Ulianov || Glory 54: Birmingham || Birmingham, United Kingdom || No Contest (accidental headbutt) || 2||1:10

|- style="background:#fbb;"
| 2018-03-31|| Loss ||align=left| Zakaria Zouggary || Glory 52: Los Angeles || Los Angeles, United States || Decision (Unanimous)  || 3 || 3:00

|-  bgcolor="#cfc"
|2017-12-09
|Win
| align="left" | Zhang Chenglong
|Glory 49: Rotterdam
|Rotterdam, Netherlands
|Decision (Unanimous)
|3
|3:00

|-  bgcolor="#cfc"
|2017-10-07
|Win
| align="left" | Jorge Rodríguez Dávila
|Road to Glory UK 70 kg Tournament
|Grantham, England
|Decision (Majority)
|3
|3:00

|-  bgcolor="#cfc"
|2017-07-14
|Win
| align="left" | Arthur Sorsor
|Glory 43: New York
|New York City, United States
|Decision (Unanimous)
|3
|3:00

|-  bgcolor="#fbb"
|2017-03-11
|Loss
| align="left" | Mo Abdurahman	
|Road to Glory UK 65 kg Tournament, Final
|Grantham, England
|Decision (Unanimous)
|3
|3:00

|-  bgcolor="#cfc"
|2017-03-11
|Win
| align="left" | Adrian Maxim	
|Road to Glory UK 65 kg Tournament, Semi Finals
|Grantham, England
|Decision (Majority)
|3
|3:00

|-  bgcolor="#cfc"
|2017-03-11
|Win
| align="left" | Andrew Liddell	
|Road to Glory UK 65 kg Tournament, Quarter Finals
|Grantham, England
|TKO (Knee to the body)
|3
|1:40

|-  bgcolor="#cfc"
|2016-10-01
|Win
| align="left" | Irtaza Haider
|Rookies Rumble
|Newark-on-Trent, England
|Decision (Unanimous)
|3
|3:00

|-  bgcolor="#cfc"
|2016-07-02
|Win
| align="left" | Robert Barry
|Home Show
|Blyth, England
|Decision (Unanimous)
|3
|3:00

|-  bgcolor="#cfc"
|2015-04-11
|Win
| align="left" | Vinny Baldwin
|Superstar Fight League 2
|Newark-on-Trent, England
|TKO
|1
|
|-  bgcolor="#cfc"
|2015-03-21
|Win
| align="left" | Joe Himsworth
|Future Stars League, Final
|Harrow, London, England
|Decision (Unanimous)
|3
|3:00

|-  bgcolor="#cfc"
|2015-03-21
|Win
| align="left" | Luke Portrainer	
|Future Stars League, Semi Final
|Harrow, London, England
|Decision (Unanimous)
|3
|3:00
|-
| colspan=9 | Legend:

References

External links
 Bailey Sugden at Glory Kickboxing

British male kickboxers
1997 births
Living people
Glory kickboxers